Madonna and Child with Saints is an oil painting on canvas by Moretto da Brescia, executed c. 1540, now displayed on an altar below the organ at the Church of San Giorgio in Braida in Verona, Italy. It shows the female martyrs Catherine of Alexandria, Lucy, Cecilia, Barbara and Agnes. It was commissioned in 1540 by the canons of the San Giorgio Monastery and is still in its original location. It was first recorded in 1648 by Carlo Ridolfi, though he and later sources were not precise as to its location.

References

1540 paintings
Paintings of the Madonna and Child by Moretto da Brescia
Paintings in Verona
Paintings of Agnes of Rome
Paintings of Saint Barbara
Paintings of Saint Cecilia
Paintings of Catherine of Alexandria
Paintings of Saint Lucy
Altarpieces
Books in art
Musical instruments in art
Sheep in art